Bulhões is a Portuguese surname. Notable people with the surname include:

 Antonio Bulhões (born 1968), Brazilian politician 
 Fernando de Bulhões (1195–1231), birth name of Portuguese Catholic saint Anthony of Padua
 Renilde Bulhões (born 1947), Brazilian physician and politician

See also
 Leopoldo de Bulhões, municipality in Goiás, Brazil

Portuguese-language surnames